Balingian is a state constituency in Sarawak, Malaysia, that has been represented in the Sarawak State Legislative Assembly since 1969.

The state constituency was created in the 1968 redistribution and is mandated to return a single member to the Sarawak State Legislative Assembly under the first past the post voting system.

History
2006–2016: The constituency contains the polling districts of Petanak Mukah, Mukah, Tellian, Litong, Penakop, Temesu, Balingian, Judan, Kuala Lama, Penakop Permai, Tellian Laut, Tutus, Jebungan, Kenyana, Sesok, Ulu Bedengan, Bedengan, Penipah, Kuala Balingian, Suyong, Liok.

2016–present: The constituency contains the polling districts of Litong, Penakop, Temesu, Balingian, Tutus, Jebungan, Kenyana, Sesok, Ulu Bedengan, Bedengan, Penipah, Kuala Balingian, Suyong, Liok.

Representation history

Election results

References
Sources

Citations

Sarawak state constituencies